Ulrich Stang  (20 January 1887 – 23 October 1972) was a Norwegian diplomat and member of Nasjonal Samling.

In 1940 he was stationed at the Norwegian legation in Berlin. In retrospect he was criticized for not bringing forward warning messages regarding the German invasion of Norway. In the legal purge in Norway after World War II however, he was only convicted for treason based on his NS membership. He was sentenced to four years of forced labour.

References

1887 births
1972 deaths
Norwegian diplomats
Norwegian expatriates in Germany
Members of Nasjonal Samling
People convicted of treason for Nazi Germany against Norway